Saskatchewan Highway 711 is a highway in the Canadian province of Saskatchewan that connects Highway 35 in the RM of Wellington No. 97 to Highway 9 in the RM of Wawken No. 93. The beginning terminus is just south of Cedoux. Osage and Corning are the only communities along the route.

Communities 
Highway 711 passes through five different rural municipalities (RMs) and two communities. The two communities are Osage
and Corning while the five RMs include Wellington No. 97, Fillmore No. 96, Golden West No. 95, Hazelwood No. 94, and Wawken No. 93.

Travel route 
Cedoux is north of the milepost 0. Highway 711 starts out westerly in the south-eastern portion of the province. At Km 29.5, Highway 711 arrives at Osage and the junction with Highway 33. There is a  concurrency with Highway 619 along the eastern edge of town. At Km 30.1, Highway 711 turns east again departing from the concurrency. The intersection with Highway 606 occurs at Km 40.0. At Km 61.1, Highway 711 is the junction with Highway 617 North. Highway 617 provides access to Glenavon. At Km 69.3, Highway 711 meets with the intersection of Highway 47. Travelling south on Highway 47 is the town of Stoughton. Travel on Highway 711 continues east and at Km 73.4 the highway arrives at Corning. Leaving Corning east there is a sharp turn south at Km 90.4. The highway resumes its easterly course and meets with intersection Highway 605 at Km 101.8. The ending terminus of Highway 711 is at Saskatchewan Highway 9 north of Moose Mountain Provincial Park and the village of Kenosee Lake. Travel north on Highway 9 to arrive at Langbank.

Intersections

See also 
Roads in Saskatchewan
Transportation in Saskatchewan

References 

711